NGC 710 is a spiral galaxy located 260 million light-years away in the constellation Andromeda. It was discovered by the Irish engineer and astronomer Bindon Blood Stoney on October 28, 1850 and is a member of the galaxy cluster Abell 262.

It is also a radio galaxy.

SN 2002eo
On August 20, 2002 a type II supernova designated as SN 2002eo was discovered in NGC 710.

See also
 List of NGC objects (1–1000)

References

External links

710
6972
Andromeda (constellation)
Astronomical objects discovered in 1850
Spiral galaxies
Abell 262
1349
Radio galaxies
Discoveries by Bindon Blood Stoney